Kyle Gurrieri (born March 10, 1998) is an American soccer player who plays for the South Carolina Gamecocks.

Gurrieri grew up in Totowa, New Jersey and attended Passaic Valley Regional High School, transferring out after his freshman year to join the U.S. Soccer U17 Residency Program in Bradenton, Florida starting in September 2013.

Club career
Former member of the US U17 National Team Residency program in Bradenton, Fl. Has represented the United States U14, U15, and U17 National Teams.

Named to the 2015 National Soccer Coaches Association of America (NSCAA) All-American Team

Before attending College, Gurrieri signed an amateur contract for a short 2 month stint with United Soccer League side Wilmington Hammerheads on July 16, 2015.

References

External links
 
 South Carolina bio

1998 births
Living people
American soccer players
People from Totowa, New Jersey
Sportspeople from Passaic County, New Jersey
Wilmington Hammerheads FC players
USL Championship players
Soccer players from New Jersey
United States men's youth international soccer players
Ocean City Nor'easters players
Syracuse Orange men's soccer players
Association football midfielders
Expatriate footballers in Sweden
American expatriate soccer players
American expatriate sportspeople in Sweden
South Carolina Gamecocks men's soccer players